{
  "type": "ExternalData",
  "service": "geoline",
  "ids": "Q7382252",
  "properties": {
    "stroke": "#FFCC00",
    "stroke-width": 6
  }
}

MBSA is responsible for public health, sanitation, waste removal and management, town planning, environmental protection and building control, social and economic development and general maintenance functions of urban infrastructure. The MBSA main headquarters is located at Persiaran Perbandaran, Shah Alam.

History 
When Shah Alam was developed as a township in 1963, the Shah Alam Town Board was founded under the Perbadanan Kemajuan Negeri Selangor or Selangor State Development Corporation (PKNS). The Town Board was then made Majlis Perbandaran Shah Alam (MPSA) or the Shah Alam Municipal Council when Shah Alam is declared the state capital of Selangor on 7 December 1978. The state secretary of Selangor at the time was chosen to be the head of the council or the Yang di-Pertua. The municipal council was based in a shophouse in Section 3 with an operational staff of 123, and began operations on 1 January 1979. The council then relocates to the Kompleks PKNS at Section 14 in 1981, and subsequently to its own building, the 28-storey Wisma MPSA in 1988. With the granting of city status in 2000, the council is upgraded into the Shah Alam City Council or known as Majlis Bandaraya Shah Alam (MBSA).

Mayor
The list of mayors is as below:

Councillors 
The 24 councillors of the Shah Alam City Council for session 2020-2022 are as follows.

Departments 
Jabatan Bangunan (Building Department)
Jabatan Kewangan (Monetary Department)
Jabatan Perancangan (Planning Department)
Jabatan Kejuruteraan (Engineering Department)
Jabatan Penilaian dan Pengurusan Harta (Valuation and Property Management Department)
Jabatan Perlesenan (Licensing Department)
Jabatan Pengurusan Sisa Pepejal dan Pembersihan Awam (Solid Waste Management and Public Cleansing Department)
Jabatan Khidmat Pengurusan (Service Management Department)
Jabatan Lanskap (Landscape Department)
Jabatan Penguatkuasaan (Enforcement Department)
Bahagian Pusat Setempat (One Stop Center Unit)
Bahagian Perundangan (Legal Unit)
Bahagian Audit dalam dan Pengaduan Awam 
Bahagian Korporat dan Pembangunan Masyarakat (Corporate and Community Development Unit)
Bahagian Pengurusan Stadium (Stadium Management Unit)
Bahagian Tender dan Ukur Bahan (Tender and Quantity Survey Unit)
Bahagian Teknologi Maklumat dan Komunkasi (Information Technology (IT) and Communication Unit)

Administration Area
Below are the administration area for MBSA which further breakdown into 24 zones.

Branch office
There is 3 branch offices, one at Sungai Buloh branch office, off Bukit Rahman Putra, and another 2 at Kota Kemuning and Setia Alam.

Awards
2013- Malaysia's Sustainable City Award

Past Members
2018-2020 Session,23 councillors as below:

References

External links 

MBSA official web site 

1978 establishments in Malaysia
Shah Alam
Shah Alam
City councils in Malaysia